Filomena Marturano is a 1950 Spanish language Argentine musical film.  It is based on the theatrical piece Filumena Marturano by the Neapolitan actor and author Eduardo De Filippo, which had been previously performed in Argentina with great success by the company of Tita Merello. It was adapted by Ariel Cortazzo and María Cruz Regás.  It was directed by Luis Mottura. It starred Tita Merello and Guillermo Battaglia.

The film was remade in 1964 as the Italian film Marriage Italian Style (Matrimonio all'italiana).

External links
 IMDb entry

1950 films
1950 musical films
Argentine musical films
1950s Spanish-language films
Films based on works by Eduardo De Filippo
Argentine films based on plays
Argentine black-and-white films
1950s Argentine films